The 2024 Rajya Sabha elections will be held as part of a routine six-year cycle among certain of the State Legislatures in India on July and August 2024 to elect 65 of its 245 members, of which the states through their legislators elect 233, and the remaining 4 are appointed by the President

Members Elected

National Capital Territory of Delhi

Sikkim

Andhra Pradesh

Bihar

Chhattisgarh

Gujarat

Himachal Pradesh

Haryana

Karnataka

Madhya Pradesh

Maharashtra

Telangana

Uttar Pradesh

Uttarakhand

West Bengal

Odisha

Rajasthan

Jharkhand

Kerala

Members Nominated

Nominated

References

Rajya Sabha
Rajya Sabha elections in India